Verlag C. H. BECK oHG, doing business as Publishers C. H. Beck, is a German publisher with its headquarters in Munich and a branch office in Frankfurt. The company was established in 1763  by Carl Heinrich Beck. Historically, its headquarters were in Nördlingen. The company publishes 70 professional journals and over 9,000 individual titles. Each month it publishes up to 1,500 new editions and publications. 550 employees work in the Munich headquarters. The 120 scientific editors combined work at the Munich and Frankfurt offices, supporting over 14,000 authors. The Frankfurt office houses the editorial departments of most of C.H. Beck's law journals. Since 1999 the Nomos publishing house belongs to C.H. Beck group.

See also

 Books in Germany

References

External links
  C.H. Beck
 Beck International

Companies based in Munich
Book publishing companies of Germany
German companies established in 1763
Academic publishing companies